Alhaurín de la Torre Club de Fútbol is a Spanish football team based in Alhaurín de la Torre, in the autonomous community of Andalusia. Founded in 1969, it currently plays in Tercera División RFEF – Group 9, holding home matches at Estadio Los Manantiales, with a 2,500-seat capacity.

History
On 4 December 1969, Lauro Club de Fútbol was founded, being later renamed into Alhaurín de la Torre Club de Fútbol. The official field became the Municipal, initially without tiers or seats, the spectators were located around the field as can be seen in the photographs. This stadium has had several renovations in its history, now called Municipal Football Stadium "El Pinar", on the road to Joaquín Blume.

Inscribed in the Málaga Football Federation in 1973, the club only played regional football until 2005, when they achieved promotion to the Tercera División after winning their Primera Andaluza group.

Season to season

12 seasons in Tercera División
1 season in Tercera División RFEF

References

External links
Official website 
Futbolme team profile 

Football clubs in Andalusia
Association football clubs established in 1969
1969 establishments in Spain
Province of Málaga